Cantiere navale fratelli Orlando (Orlando Brothers Shipyard) is a historical Italian shipyard in Livorno.

History
It was founded by Luigi Orlando and his brothers Giuseppe, Paolo and Salvatore who moved to Livorno from Genoa where in 1858 they had the management of Ansaldo which produced marine machines and cannons, in 1861 they directed the factory to the construction of ships.

Cantiere Navale Fratelli Orlando
Luigi Orlando on August 31, 1865 signed a thirty years concession for the buildings and the area of the former Lazzaretto di San Rocco (Saint Roch lazaret) which was transformed in an arsenal by Tommaso Mati in 1852.
The shipyard entered into works the following year, and on July 29, 1867, the first ship was launched, the ironclad  for the Regia Marina. The shipyard developed and built the gunboats Alfredo Cappellini (1868) and Faa di Bruno (1869) for the Regia Marina and on March 17, 1883 the most difficult launch was that of the ironclad Lepanto, on project by Benedetto Brin, because of the inadequacy of the dock. The Lepanto was entirely built by the shipyard in each part including the machineries and the armament. It was then decided to build the new Scalo Morosini (Morosini slipway) toward the entrance of the harbour in open sea to ease the launch of greater ships. The shipyard had 1,140 workers employed in 1886 and other 600 workers were occupied by Metallurgica Italiana founded by the Orlando Brothers and connected to the shipbuilding.

Luigi Orlando died on June 14, 1896, and the new management had to face a decrease in the production due to the markets. In 1904 the shipyard merged into the group Società degli Alti Forni, Fonderie e Acciaierie di Terni changing the denomination in “Cantiere Navale Fratelli Orlando & C.”. Until World War I, only few ships were built for the Regia Marina, among these the armored cruiser Varese (1899) and the Pisa (1907); the most part of the naval production was for the foreigner navy as the Argentinean General Belgrano (1896) and the armored cruiser Georgios Averof of the Royal Hellenic Navy built in 1911.
Following the failure of the Cantieri Gallinari (Gallinari yard), the Orlando shipyard acquired the structures and the machineries enclosed the motor yacht Makook III for the Khedive of Egypt, which was modified respect to the Gallinari project. During World War I the shipyard built submarines, cruisers, destroyers and torpedo armed motorboats, and in 1925 the name was transformed in “Cantieri Navali Orlando  Società Anonima”. With the advent of the Fascism the government launched a plan to develop and renew the fleet ordering to the shipyard the construction of the heavy cruiser Trento launched on October 4, 1927; the cruiser Veinticinco de Mayo was built in 1929 for the Argentine Navy.

OTO Cantiere di Livorno

Orlando shipyard was integrated in 1929 by the company “Odero Terni Orlando” abbreviated “OTO”, which reunited the Cantieri navali Odero, Cantiere navale del Muggiano and Vickers Terni with the management transferred to Genova; OTO was incorporated in the IRI in 1933.
The shipyard received numerous orders from the Regia Marina for cruisers as Gorizia (1930), Pola (1931) and the destroyers of the Oriani-class and Soldati-class while in 1937 was built the destroyer Tashkent for the Soviet Navy. The shipyard during the World War II continued to build ships as Attilio Regolo, Scipione Africano, Legionario, Velite, Corsario, Antilope, Gazzella and Camoscio  all finished, while others were never completed since May 28, 1943, the allied bombings over Livorno practically destroyed the shipyard, though some mechanical workshops had been transferred in another factory and by the Naval Academy. The Armistice took effect on September 8, 1943, and the German troops occupied the shipyard until July 1944, when the Allied troops arrived. In the post-war period  the Genoa management thought that the Livorno plant had to be closed, but the workers and the population decided to restore the facility, which was the main industry in town. The new director, Marcello Orlando, grandson of Luigi, projected the reconstruction according to the system of prefabrication, and the IRI disposed in February 1949 the repairing of the Morosini slipway.

Ansaldo Stabilimento Luigi Orlando

The Livorno shipyard and the Cantiere navale del Muggiano were incorporated by Ansaldo in 1949 and was renamed to “Ansaldo S.p.A. Stabilimento Luigi Orlando”. The shipyard was equipped with new and powerful cranes able to move on rails along the docks and allowing the installation of large prefabricated elements. In that years about 2,000 workers were employed and were built ships like the tanker Mino d’Amico (1954), Adriana Fassio (1957), Antonietta Fassio (1960), the frigate Centauro (1954), the destroyers Indomito (1955) and Intrepido (1962) for the Italian Navy and the Almirante Clemente-class destroyer: Almirante Clemente (1954), General Jose J. Flores (1954), General Jose Moran (1955) and Almirante Brion (1955), General Juan de Austria (1956) and Almirante Garcia (1956) for the Venezuelan Navy.

Cantiere navale Luigi Orlando
In 1964 Ansaldo decided to dispose of the shipyard and it was acquired by “Cantiere navale Luigi Orlando S.p.A.” which returned to its own autonomy. The shipyard built frigates and corvettes for the Indonesian Navy, fishing boats for the South Korea, ferries for Italy, tankers, gas carriers, bulk carriers. In 1967 was projected to build a new large dry dock capable of repairing ships up to 300,000 tons, it is the major in the Mediterranean region. The shipyard slowed the production utilizing the Umbria slipway launching 13 Espresso-class ferries for Traghetti del Mediterraneo, ro-ro cargo, gas carriers and tankers.

Fincantieri Cantiere di Livorno
The shipyard was merged into Fincantieri on January 1, 1984 with the denomination “Fincantieri Cantieri Navali Italiani S.p.A. Stabilimento di Livorno”. The shipyard built fourteen ships as ro-ro containers, tankers and ferries. In order to be economical Fincantieri understood that was not possible to compete in the international market with an unfit plant to manufacture fast ferries, in 1995 decided to close the Livorno shipyard.

Cantiere navale fratelli Orlando
The "Cantiere navale fratelli Orlando s.c.r.l." was created on January 1, 1996 by a consortium of five cooperatives to start a society composed by the 360 employees of the shipyard. The new cooperative continued to produce and repair ships, were built: Monte Bello (1997), Giovanni Fagioli (1998), Mimmo Ievoli (1998), Ievoli Shine (1998), Isola Amaranto (1999), Montallegro (1999), Enrico Ievoli (1999), Isola Atlantica (2000), Mega Express (2001), Mega Express Two (2001), Gennaro Ievoli (2003) and the last one Pertinacia (2003). Despite the sacrifices of the workers other factors influenced the survival of the shipyard as the market crisis, the Asian competitors, the absence of an entrepreneurial tradition of the management and the building of the two Mega Express for Corsica Ferries - Sardinia Ferries which caused heavy financial losses leading to the closure of the shipyard in 2002. The historical shipyard was acquired by Azimut-Benetti, builders of luxury yachts in 2003.

Ships built

 Adamastor
 Alce
 Vittorio Alfieri
 Almirante Briòn
 Almirante Clemente
 Almirante Garcia
 Animoso
 Antilope
 Ardente
 Ardito
 Artigliere
 Ascari
 Audace
 Georgios Averof
 Aviere
 Caio Mario
 Calatafimi
 Camicia Nera
 Camoscio
 Alfredo Cappellini
 Caprera
 Capriolo
 Giosuè Carducci
 Carrista
 Castelfidardo
 Centauro
 Cervo
 Confienza
 Conte Verde
 Corazziere
 Corsaro
 Curtatone
 Daino
 Emanuele Filiberto Duca d'Aosta
 Etruria
 Ettore Fieramosca
 Gazzella
 General Austria
 General Belgrano
 General Flores
 General Moran
 Geniere
 Vincenzo Gioberti
 Gorizia
 Indomito
 Intrepido
 Legionario
 Lepanto
 Monzabano
 Alfredo Oriani
 Palestro
 Pisa
 Pola
 Attilio Regolo
 Renna
 San Martín
 San Martino
 Scipione Africano
 Solferino
 Squadrista
 Stambecco
 Tashkent
 Claudio Tiberio
 Salvatore Todaro
 Trento
 Umbria
 Varese
 Veinticinco de Mayo
 Velite
 Vesuvio

References

Bibliography

External links

Benetti official website
List of the ships built by Cantiere navale fratelli Orlando

1866 establishments in Italy
Shipyards of Italy
Livorno
Shipbuilding companies of Italy